Kafki may refer to:
 Kafki, Razavi Khorasan
 Kafki, South Khorasan